Barclay de Tolly Monument is a monument in Tartu, Estonia. The monument is erected in the honor of Baltic-German field marshal Michael Andreas Barclay de Tolly. The monument is listed as cultural heritage monument of Estonia.

The monument is designed by I. Demut–Malinovski and A. Stsedrin. The monument opened in 1849.

References

External links

Cultural heritage of Estonia
Monuments and memorials in Estonia
Tartu